Andrea Roth (born September 30, 1967) is a Canadian actress. She is perhaps best known for her roles as Janet Gavin, the wife of main character Tommy Gavin, on the FX television series Rescue Me (2004–2011), as Victoria Chase in The Collector (2009), and before that, as Diana Powers/NeuroBrain on RoboCop: The Series (1994).

Life and career
Roth, a first-generation Canadian, was born in Woodstock, Ontario, to a Scottish mother and a Dutch father.

Her first big role was in the Canadian horror film The Club (1994), directed by Brenton Spencer, and appeared in numerous television series and TV movies before landing her role on Rescue Me. Her other long role was that of Diana/NeuroBrain on RoboCop: The Series, who appeared in all episodes.  Roth also appeared in the Jet Li action film War (2007).  Furthermore, she guest-starred on Blue Bloods and Ringer.

On March 29, 2010, Roth gave birth to a daughter with Todd Biermann. The couple married on October 7, 2011.

Filmography

Film

Television

References

External links
 
 Andrea Roth on Myspace

1967 births
20th-century Canadian actresses
21st-century Canadian actresses
Actresses from Ontario
Canadian expatriates in the United States
Canadian film actresses
Canadian television actresses
Canadian people of Dutch descent
Canadian people of Scottish descent
Living people
People from Woodstock, Ontario